Lee James Crozier (born 16 October 1973) is an English cricketer.  Crozier is a right-handed batsman who bowls right-arm off break.  He was born in Newcastle-upon-Tyne, Northumberland.

Crozier made his debut for Northumberland against Hertfordshire in the 1996 Minor Counties Championship.  He played Minor counties cricket for Northumberland from 1996 to 2006, making 46 Minor Counties Championship appearances and 31 MCCA Knockout Trophy appearances.  He made his List A debut against Ireland in the 1999 NatWest Trophy.  He made 7 further List A appearances, the last of which came against Middlesex in the 2005 Cheltenham & Gloucester Trophy.  In his 8 List A matches, he took 12 wickets at an average of 30.75, with best figures of 3/30.  With the bat, he scored 14 runs at a batting average of 4.66, with a high score of 6 not out.

References

External links
Lee Crozier at ESPNcricinfo
Lee Crozier at CricketArchive

1973 births
Living people
Cricketers from Newcastle upon Tyne
English cricketers
Northumberland cricketers